Rahumäe (Estonian for "Peace Hill" or "Quiet Hill") is a subdistrict in the district of Nõmme, Tallinn, the capital of Estonia.

Rahumäe has a railway station on the Elron western route.

The Rahumäe and the Jewish cemeteries are situated in Rahumäe.

Gallery

References

Subdistricts of Tallinn